Brusnica is a village and municipality in Stropkov District in the Prešov Region of north-eastern Slovakia.

History
In historical records the village was first mentioned in 1408.

Geography
The municipality lies at an altitude of 199 metres and covers an area of 14.283 km². It has a population of about 415 people. The village has a significant Rusyn minority (32%) and smaller Romani minority (2%), along with the majority of Slovaks (65%).

Genealogical resources

The records for genealogical research are available at the state archive "Statny Archiv in Presov, Slovakia"

 Roman Catholic church records (births/marriages/deaths): 1700-1897 (parish B)
 Greek Catholic church records (births/marriages/deaths): 1831-1946 (parish A)

See also
 List of municipalities and towns in Slovakia

References

External links
 
 
https://web.archive.org/web/20071217080336/http://www.statistics.sk/mosmis/eng/run.html
Surnames of living people in Brusnica

Villages and municipalities in Stropkov District
Rusyns in Slovakia